DXPE (91.9 FM), broadcasting as 91.9 Nice FM, is a radio station owned and operated by PEC Broadcasting Corporation. The station's studio and Transmitter are located along Daang Maharlika, Kidapawan.

References

Radio stations established in 2015
Radio stations in Cotabato